Emanuel Cook (born January 20, 1988) is an American football safety who is currently a free agent. He was signed by the New York Jets as an undrafted free agent in 2009. He played college football at South Carolina. Cook has also been a member of the Tampa Bay Buccaneers, Hartford Colonials, and Baltimore Ravens.

Early years
Cook graduated from Palm Beach Gardens Community High School where he rushed for 2,027 yards and 27 touchdowns as a senior and was recognized as the South Florida Sun-Sentinel Player of the Year for large schools. He led his team to the Class 6A state title as a senior, marking the first state championship in school history. Cook ran for 373 yards and five touchdowns in a game against Atlantic, busted a 99-yard run vs. Lake Worth in the playoffs, and rushed for 243 yards and four scores in the state title game.

College career
In 2008 Cook was the team's leading tackler but was declared academically ineligible for the Outback Bowl. His 2008 totals were 97 tackles (62 solo) and one interception. In 2007, he earned second-team All-SEC honors by the SEC coaches, the Associated Press, and Rivals.com. He led the team with 92 tackles, including 77 solos, including eight for losses. He also had 4 sacks, 3 interceptions, 5 passes broken up and forced 2 fumbles. In 2006, he earned freshman All-SEC honors by both the league's coaches and the Sporting News and tied for third on the team in tackles with 47, including 40 solo stops and five tackles for loss, despite playing only 10 games.

Professional career

Pre-draft

New York Jets
Cook was signed by the New York Jets as an undrafted free agent and then released prior to the 2009 NFL season.

Tampa Bay Buccaneers
Cook was signed to the Tampa Bay Buccaneers' practice squad on November 11, 2009. On January 5, 2010, he was signed to a reserve/future contract. He was waived on June 18.

Second stint with the New York Jets
Cook was re-signed by the New York Jets on July 29, 2010. Cook was then waived by the team on September 3, 2010.

Hartford Colonials
Cook was signed by the Hartford Colonials of the United Football League on September 16, 2010.

Third stint with the New York Jets
Cook was re-signed by the Jets on December 8, 2010 to a three-year contract following injuries to safeties Jim Leonhard and James Ihedigbo. Cook was waived on November 28, 2011.

Baltimore Ravens
Cook was claimed off waivers by the Baltimore Ravens on November 29, 2011.

Orlando Predators
On April 28, 2015, Cook was assigned to the Orlando Predators of the Arena Football League. On January 5, 2016, Cook was placed on recallable reassignment. On March 30, 2016, Cook was assigned to the Predators once again.

Tampa Bay Storm
On October 14, 2016, Cook was assigned to the Tampa Bay Storm in the dispersal draft.

References

External links

Baltimore Ravens bio
South Carolina Gamecocks bio

1988 births
Living people
People from Palm Beach Gardens, Florida
Players of American football from Florida
American football safeties
African-American players of American football
South Carolina Gamecocks football players
New York Jets players
Tampa Bay Buccaneers players
Hartford Colonials players
Baltimore Ravens players
Orlando Predators players
Tampa Bay Storm players
21st-century African-American sportspeople
20th-century African-American people